The House Way and Means Subcommittee on Trade is one of the six subcommittees within the House Ways and Means Committee

Jurisdiction
From the House Rules:

The jurisdiction of the Subcommittee on Trade shall include bills and matters referred to the Committee on Ways and Means that relate to customs and customs administration including tariff and import fee structure, classification, valuation of and special rules applying to imports, and special tariff provisions and procedures which relate to customs operation affecting exports and imports; import trade matters, including import impact, industry relief from injurious imports, adjustment assistance and programs to encourage competitive responses to imports, unfair import practices including anti-dumping and countervailing duty provisions, and import policy which relates to dependence on foreign sources of supply; commodity agreements and reciprocal trade agreements including multilateral and bilateral trade negotiations and implementation of agreements involving tariff and non-tariff trade barriers to and distortions of international trade; international rules, organizations and institutional aspects of international trade agreements; budget authorizations for the customs revenue functions of the Department of Homeland Security, the U.S. International Trade Commission, and the U.S. Trade Representative; and special trade-related problems involving market access, competitive conditions of specific industries, export policy and promotion, access to materials in short supply, bilateral trade relations including trade with developing countries, operations of multinational corporations, and trade with non-market economies.

Members, 117th Congress

Historical membership rosters

115th Congress

116th Congress

References

External links
Ways and Means Committee Website: Subcommittee Page

Ways and Means Trade